Alejandro Padilla (born March 22, 1973) is an American politician serving as the junior United States senator from California since 2021. A member of the Democratic Party, Padilla served more than seven years on the Los Angeles City Council, representing the 7th district. First elected in 1999, he was the president of the Los Angeles City Council from 2001 to 2006. He then served in the California State Senate for the 20th district from 2006 to 2014. After that, he served as the 30th secretary of state of California from 2015 to 2021.

Governor Gavin Newsom appointed Padilla to the United States Senate after then-Senator Kamala Harris was elected Vice President of the United States; Harris, as the newly elected vice president and president of the Senate, swore Padilla in on January 20, 2021. In dual November 2022 elections, Padilla won a special election to complete his term (California law limits how long appointed U.S. senators may serve) as well as election to a full term in the Senate, besting Republican nominee Mark Meuser.

Early life and education
Padilla is one of three children of Santos and Lupe Padilla, both of whom immigrated from Mexico, specifically Jalisco and Chihuahua, before meeting and marrying in Los Angeles, where he was born. He grew up in Pacoima, Los Angeles, and graduated from San Fernando High School in the northeast San Fernando Valley. He earned a degree in mechanical engineering from Massachusetts Institute of Technology (MIT) in 1994. He graduated from the Coro Fellows Southern California Program in 1995.

Early career

Los Angeles 
After graduation, Padilla moved back to Pacoima and briefly worked as an engineer for Hughes Aircraft, where he wrote software for satellite systems.

Padilla is a former member of the governing board of MIT and president of the National Association of Latino Elected and Appointed Officials (NALEO), which has a membership of more than 6,000 Latino U.S. officials. He has chaired the Los Angeles Leadership Council for the American Diabetes Association since 2005.

Padilla began in politics as a member of the Democratic Party in 1995, in substantial part in response to California Proposition 187, which excluded illegal immigrants from all non-emergency public services, including public education, but which he felt was motivated by a broader nativism that demonized legal and illegal immigrants alike. His first professional role was as a personal assistant to Senator Dianne Feinstein. He then served as a campaign manager for Assemblyman Tony Cárdenas in 1996, Assemblyman Gil Cedillo in 1997, and State Senator Richard Alarcon in 1998, all Democrats. All won their respective elections.

Los Angeles City Council
On July 1, 1999, at age 26, Padilla was sworn in as a member of the Los Angeles City Council. Two years later, his colleagues elected him council president. Padilla was the first Latino and the youngest person elected president of the Los Angeles City Council, defeating incumbent Ruth Galanter. On September 13, 2001, two days after the 9/11 attacks, Padilla became the acting mayor of Los Angeles for a couple of days while Mayor James K. Hahn traveled out of the city. Los Angeles Times wrote that Padilla's rise to the mayor's office raised his "political stock".

During his term as City Council president, Padilla also was elected president of the California League of Cities, the first Latino to serve in that position.

California State Senate
After retiring as president of the Los Angeles City Council, Padilla was elected to the State Senate in 2006, defeating Libertarian Pamela Brown. He was reelected in 2010 with nearly 70% of the vote over Republican Kathleen Evans. Padilla served as a member of the Appropriations Committee, Business and Professions and Economic Development Committee, Governmental Organization Committee, Labor and Industrial Relations Committee, and chaired the Select Committee on Science, Innovation and Public Policy. He left office on November 30, 2014, after two terms.

In August 2012, Padilla was included in a list of 20 Latino political rising stars compiled by the San Francisco Chronicle, citing his role in the National Association of Latino Elected and Appointed Officials.

In September 2014, Padilla promoted what would later become Proposition 67, a proposed ban on plastic bags. On November 8, 2016, when Padilla was Secretary of State, the proposal was voted on in a referendum, and the option in favor of the ban on the plastics bags received 53% of the vote. Padilla authored legislation that passed in 2008 that requires some restaurants to disclose calorie information on menus.

30th Secretary of State of California (2015–2021) 

On April 11, 2013, Padilla announced his intention to run for California secretary of state in 2014, to succeed the term-limited Debra Bowen. He was expected to face an intraparty battle with fellow Democrat Leland Yee, but Yee's arrest for felony racketeering caused Yee to abandon the race. Padilla won the election on November 4, 2014, with 53.6% of the vote, defeating Republican Pete Peterson.

On June 29, 2017, the Presidential Advisory Commission on Election Integrity, which President Donald Trump created on May 11, requested data on enrolled voters from every state, dating back to 2006. Padilla said that California would not supply the data.

On November 6, 2018, Padilla was reelected with 64.5% of the vote, defeating Republican Mark P. Meuser.

On October 16, 2020, Padilla was involved in a controversy between the state and the California Republican Party, as the party deployed unofficial ballot boxes for voters to submit their ballots at select locations, including churches and gun stores in competitive California districts. Padilla issued a cease-and-desist order, arguing that the ballot boxes were illegal and failed to ensure ballot security. Local Republican leadership refused to follow the order and said the boxes were a form of legal ballot harvesting that had been enabled by recent Democratic legislation (which lacked a chain of custody requirement), and were a way to increase voter turnout. Accusing Democrats of hypocrisy given their widespread door-to-door ballot harvesting in the 2018 United States elections, the state Republican Party later agreed to a set of collection procedures and said a volunteer's mistake of affixing a sign denoting the ballot box as "official" had contributed to the political standoff; Padilla's office said it was continuing to investigate whether ballots were being handled correctly and that the "ineptitude or unlawfulness of a political operative or campaign volunteer" could nonetheless lead to "serious legal consequences".

In early 2020, Padilla announced a $35 million no-bid contract for a statewide voter education ad campaign with partisan public relations firm SKDK (then known as "SKDKnickerbocker") called "Vote Safe California", but State Controller Betty Yee blocked the funding because Padilla's office did not have the authority to use federal money that was allocated to county governments; the campaign proceeded anyway. The group had marketed itself as being on "Team Biden", and the awarding of the no-bid contract under supposed "emergency powers" despite the group's ties with the Democratic Party and work for Democratic politicians running for office in California received bipartisan criticism. Amid ongoing litigation by the Howard Jarvis Taxpayers Association, who contend that the contract bypassed fair competition rules and misappropriated federal election funding for local elections operations, and was therefore illegal, Governor Newsom signed legislation that provided state funding to reimburse SKDK in February 2021.

Upon Padilla's appointment to the U.S. Senate, Newsom appointed Assemblywoman Shirley Weber to succeed him.

United States Senator from California (2021–present)

Appointment
In August 2020, Democratic presidential nominee Joe Biden selected California Senator Kamala Harris as his running mate. After they won the general election, Padilla was mentioned as a possible choice as Harris's successor in the Senate. Governor Newsom had the power to appoint her successor. In December 2020, Newsom announced that he would appoint Padilla to the seat, making him California's first Hispanic senator and the first male U.S. senator from California since Alan Cranston retired in 1993. During the speculation about whom Newsom would appoint, the senior senator from California, Dianne Feinstein, supported Padilla. To replace Padilla as California's secretary of state, Newsom appointed state assemblywoman Shirley Weber.

Most Latinos, who are 40% of California's population, supported Padilla's appointment, but some black leaders, who wanted another black woman to replace Harris, criticized it. San Francisco Mayor London Breed called Padilla's appointment "a real blow to the African American community".

Elections

2022 

Padilla announced that he would seek a full term in 2022. He appeared on two ballots: one for the special election to fill the remainder of his term in the 117th Congress, and the other for the new term beginning with the 118th Congress. The special election was due to a recent change in California law that ended Padilla's appointment in November 2022. He was on the ballot in two separate races in the November 2022 election—a special election for the final two months of Harris's Senate term, and a regular election for a full six-year term beginning in January 2023.

Tenure
On January 20, 2021, Padilla was sworn into the United States Senate in the 117th Congress by Vice President Kamala Harris, his predecessor, becoming the first Latino to represent California in the U.S. Senate. He was sworn in by Vice President Harris on her first day, at the same time as new Georgia senators Jon Ossoff and Raphael Warnock. He served the final two years of Harris's term. He filed the necessary paperwork with the FEC to run for a full term and an unexpired term in the 2022 elections which he won in November 2022.

While in office, Padilla introduced legislation to add more legal protections for various public lands in California, including parts of the San Gabriel Mountains,  Los Padres National Forest, and Carrizo Plain National Monument. Padilla also introduced legislation to help coastal communities adapt shorelines to increased flooding and erosion from sea level rise and extreme weather.

Committee assignments
 Committee on the Judiciary
 Subcommittee on Immigration, Citizenship, and Border Safety (Chairman)
 Committee on the Budget
 Committee on Environment and Public Works
 Committee on Homeland Security and Governmental Affairs
 Committee on Rules and Administration

Caucus memberships
 Congressional Hispanic Caucus
 Senate Cultural Caucus
 Congressional Asian Pacific American Caucus
 Rare Disease Caucus

Political positions
The Wall Street Journal says that Padilla had "a reputation [in the State Senate] as a business-friendly moderate". FiveThirtyEight defined him as a technocrat, not identified with either the progressive or the moderate wing of the party. The American Conservative Union gave Padilla a 0% rating in 2012. On January 18, 2021, Padilla released a statement in support of the Green New Deal and Medicare For All legislation, among other progressive policies.

Abortion 
Padilla favors abortion rights, saying in 2018 that abortion rights are "not negotiable". In 2008, Padilla sponsored the bill SB 1770, which would require the Commission on Peace Officer Standards Training (POST) to prepare relevant guidelines and mechanisms for the investigation and reporting of "cases involving anti-reproductive-rights crimes". In 2018, after winning the primary for secretary of state to seek a second term, he received support from NARAL Pro-Choice America.

When Roe v. Wade was overturned in June 2022, Padilla condemned the decision.

LGBTQIA+ rights
Padilla supports transgender rights.

Climate and environment 
Padilla supports climate action and said during budgetary discussions in October 2021 that "[c]limate cannot be on the chopping block in this or any budget." He supports the Green New Deal and has said that it "offers a once-in-a-generation opportunity." Padilla received a 100% score from the League of Conservation Voters in 2021.

Filibuster 
Padilla supports ending the Senate filibuster.

Immigration 
Padilla supports immigrants' rights. On January 15, 2021, he said that he supports legislation sponsored by representative Joaquin Castro to speed up the citizenship process for undocumented immigrants in essential jobs, declaring that because of the work they do, "they deserve stability".

Voting rights 
Padilla has been known for efforts to expand voting access. When he was appointed to the Senate in 2021, Newsom called him "a national defender of voting rights".

Personal life
Padilla married Angela Monzon in 2012. They have three sons and live in the San Fernando Valley's Porter Ranch neighborhood. In late 2015 and early 2016, the Aliso Canyon gas leak temporarily displaced the Padillas from their home.

Electoral history

See also 
 List of Hispanic and Latino Americans in the United States Congress

References

External links

 Senator Alex Padilla official U.S. Senate website
 Alex Padilla for Senate campaign website
 

|-

|-

|-

|-

|-

|-

|-

1973 births
20th-century American politicians
21st-century American politicians
American campaign managers
American politicians of Mexican descent
Democratic Party California state senators
Democratic Party United States senators from California
Engineers from California
Living people
Los Angeles City Council members
MIT School of Engineering alumni
People from Pacoima, Los Angeles
Politicians from Los Angeles
San Fernando High School alumni
School counseling
Secretaries of State of California
University of the Pacific (United States) faculty